Evergreen Cemetery and Crematory is a cemetery and crematorium located at 1137 North Broad Street, Hillside, Union County, New Jersey.  Parts of it are in Hillside, Elizabeth, and Newark.

The cemetery is listed on both the New Jersey Register and the National Register of Historic Places, since 1991.

Notable graves include authors Stephen Crane, Mary Mapes Dodge and Edward Stratemeyer.  Six former U.S. Congressmen (including one who became Senator) and one non-voting delegate (from Alaska) are buried there as well.

The cemetery also is known for having a section of plots devoted to Romani "gypsy" families.

It is adjacent to Weequahic Golf Course.

King of the Gypsies was filmed there with Shelley Winters.

Notable interments

 James Vote Bomford (1811–1892), Civil War Union Brevet Brigadier General
 William Brant Jr. (1842–1898), Civil War Medal of Honor recipient
 John Brisbin (1818–1880), U.S. Representative from Pennsylvania's 11th congressional district, 1851
 William Chetwood (1771–1857), U.S. Representative from New Jersey at-large, 1836–37
 Adoniram Judson Clark (1838–1913), Civil War Union Army officer
 Amos Clark Jr. (1828–1912), U.S. Representative from New Jersey's 3rd congressional district, 1873–75
 Stephen Crane (1871–1900), author; known for his war novel The Red Badge of Courage (1895)
 Barton Wood Currie (1877–1962), American journalist and author
 Mary Mapes Dodge (1831–1905), author; known for her novel Hans Brinker or the Silver Skates (1865)
 James M. Drake (1837–1913), Civil War Medal of Honor recipient
 George F. Houston (1896–1944), Broadway and Hollywood actor
 Adolphus J. Johnson (1815–1893), Civil War Union Army officer
 Phineas Jones (1819–1884), represented New Jersey's 6th congressional district,  1881–83
 Abraham Kaiser (1852–1912), businessman and politician
 John Kean (1852–1914), U.S. Representative from New Jersey's 3rd congressional district, 1883–85, 1887–89; United States Senator from New Jersey
 Rufus King Jr. (1838–1900), Civil War Medal of Honor recipient
 William J. Magie (1832–1917), Justice of the New Jersey Supreme Court 1880–1900, serving as Chief Justice from 1897 to 1900
 Luther Martin (1827–1863), Civil War Union Army officer
 Edward Stratemeyer (1862–1930), author and creator of The Hardy Boys (1927) and Nancy Drew (1930) book series
 Charles August Sulzer (1879–1919), delegate to U.S. Congress from Alaska Territory, 1917–19
 William Sulzer (1863–1941), Governor of New York in 1913 who was impeached and removed from office later that year
 Homer W. Wheeler (1848–1930), U.S. army officer and author

See also

 List of cemeteries in New Jersey
 List of people from New Jersey

References

External links

 Evergreen Cemetery (Hillside, New Jersey) Website
 
 Interment information at the Political Graveyard

Year of establishment missing
Cemeteries in Union County, New Jersey
Cemeteries on the National Register of Historic Places in New Jersey
Crematoria in the United States
Geography of Elizabeth, New Jersey
Hillside, New Jersey
National Register of Historic Places in Union County, New Jersey
Romani in the United States
Buildings and structures in Elizabeth, New Jersey